The Macon Historic District is a  historic district in Macon, Georgia that was listed on the National Register of Historic Places in 1974 and was expanded in 1995.  The original listing covered  and included 1,050 contributing resources; the increase added  and 157 contributing resources (of which 10 acres and 10 contributing buildings were already listed on the National Register in the Macon Railroad Industrial District).

Macon was founded in 1823 in Bibb County on the bank of the Ocmulgee River.  Many buildings reflect the 19th-century Greek Revival and Victorian styles of architecture.  The district has commercial, government, educational, and residential buildings.  The majority of their architectural features have been preserved.

A total of 1047 buildings, two structures, and one object contribute to the Macon Historical District.  Several of the contributing properties are separately listed on the NRHP.

History
What is now downtown is part of the original 1823 plan of James Webb.  In 1836 Macon chartered the first college in the world to grant degrees only to women - originally named Georgia Female College, it is now called Wesleyan College.  The original building is located on what is now College Street.  Mercer University moved to the area in 1871.  The original residential area is known as "College Hill".  While many buildings were constructed after the American Civil War, the district includes one of the largest collections of antebellum Greek Revival architecture in the U.S.  These still exist because William T. Sherman bypassed Macon in his March to the Sea.

Historic Macon Foundation
The Historic Macon Foundation revitalizes communities by preserving architecture and sharing history. The foundation won the 2018 Trustees Award for Organizational Excellence from the National Trust for Historic Preservation. In 2019 the Foundation held a community meeting to kick off discussion for the Scenic Preservation Index to identify priority places for preservation.

Contributing buildings
The historic district includes 34 buildings that are separately listed on the National Register:
Judge Clifford Anderson House
Captain R.J. Anderson House
Ambrose Baber House
Thomas C. Burke House
Cannonball House
Christ Episcopal Church
Cowles House
Dasher-Stevens House
Domingos House
Emerson-Holmes Building
First Presbyterian Church
Goodall House (now demolished)
Grand Opera House
Green-Poe House
Hatcher-Groover-Schwartz House
Holt–Peeler–Snow House
Johnston-Hay House
Sidney Lanier Cottage
Lassiter House
W. G. Lee Alumni House
Mercer University Administration Building
Militia Headquarters Building
Monroe Street Apartments
Municipal Auditorium (Macon, Georgia)
Munroe-Dunlap-Snow House
Old Macon Library
Old U.S. Post Office and Federal Building (Macon, Georgia)
Raines-Carmichael House
Randolph-Whittle House
Rock Rogers House
Slate House
Solomon-Curd House
St. Joseph's Catholic Church (Macon, Georgia)
Willingham-Hill-O'Neal Cottage

Other selected properties include:
Wells-Hurley-Massey House (1891), with a mansard roof

Architects involved include:
Elam Alexander
James B. Ayres
Elias Carter
U.S. Treasury
William Elliot Dunwody, IV
Dennis and Dennis
Curran R. Ellis
Swarthout, Edgerton (or Edgerton Swarthout?)
Dunwody and Oliphant
Neel Reid
Alfred Fellheimer
Gurdon P. Randall
Alexander Blair
Jere Fuss
A. Sidney Brown

Photos

See also
 National Register of Historic Places listings in Bibb County, Georgia

References

External links

Historic districts on the National Register of Historic Places in Georgia (U.S. state)
Greek Revival architecture in Georgia (U.S. state)
Victorian architecture in Georgia (U.S. state)
Buildings and structures completed in 1830
National Register of Historic Places in Bibb County, Georgia